= Shenshi =

Shenshi may refer to:

- Shaanxi province of People's Republic of China
- 绅士, the gentry class in imperial China
